The Tusishvili (archaically known as Tusisshvili, ტუსისშვილი) was a Georgian princely family, known in the eastern province of Kakheti from 1469. The Tusishvili branched off the House of Zedginidze. They had their estates at Akhmeta and Gagma-Mkhari on the left bank of the Alazani. After Russian annexation of Georgia, the family was incorporated among the Russian princely houses in 1850.

A notable member of this family was the 18th-century churchman Saba, Metropolitan Bishop of Ninotsminda (1744–88), and a close associate of King Erekle II.

References 

Noble families of Georgia (country)
Georgian-language surnames